Epicrocis festivella is a species of snout moth in the genus Epicrocis. It was described by Zeller in 1848, and is known from Java, Indonesia and Taiwan.

References

Moths described in 1848
Phycitini